Pterolophia gibbosipennis is a species of beetle in the family Cerambycidae. It was described by Maurice Pic in 1926.

Subspecies
 Pterolophia gibbosipennis iriomotei Breuning & Ohbayashi,
 Pterolophia gibbosipennis gibbosipennis Pic, 1926
 Pterolophia gibbosipennis subcristipennis Breuning & Ohbayashi,
 Pterolophia gibbosipennis kuniyoshii Hayashi, 1968

References

gibbosipennis
Beetles described in 1926